Ellis Robson (born 14 September 1998) is a professional rugby league footballer who plays as a  or  for Keighley Cougars in the Betfred Championship.

He has spent time on loan from Warrington at the Dewsbury Rams, Widnes Vikings, Rochdale Hornets, Salford Red Devils and the Bradford Bulls in the Betfred Championship.

Career

Warrington Wolves
Robson made his Super League debut in round 11 of the 2020 Super League season for the Wolves against Hull FC.

On 23 October 2020 it was announced that although Robson had previously signed with the Ottawa Aces for 2021, Ottawa agreed to waive the contract in order for Robson to remain at Warrington after being offered a two year deal with his current club.

Widnes Vikings
On 22 April 2021 it was reported that he had signed for the Widnes Vikings in the RFL Championship on loan. Robson made his 3rd loan debut for Widnes against the Batley Bulldogs on 24 Apr 2021.

Salford Red Devils (loan)
On 29 June 2021 it was reported that he had signed for the Salford Red Devils in the Super League on loan.

Keighley Cougars
On 28 September 2022 Robson signed for the Keighley Cougars in the Betfred Championship on a 2-year deal.

References

External links
Warrington Wolves profile

1998 births
Living people
Bradford Bulls players
Dewsbury Rams players
English rugby league players
Keighley Cougars players
Newcastle Thunder players
Rochdale Hornets players
Rugby league second-rows
Salford Red Devils players
Toulouse Olympique players
Warrington Wolves players
Widnes Vikings players